Semiotics of Fashion is the study of fashion and how humans signify specific social and cultural positions through dress. Ferdinand de Saussure defined semiotics as "the science of the life of signs in society". Semiotics is the study of signs and just as we can interpret signs and construct meaning from text we can also construct meaning from visual images such as fashion. Fashion is a language of signs that non-verbally converse meanings about individuals and groups. It holds a symbolic and communicative role having the capacity to express one's unique style, identity, profession, social status, and gender or group affiliation.

Clothing is a non-verbal sign that can be interpreted differently depending on the context, situation or culture. It's in this way that the semiotics of fashion can be linked to social semiotics. According to Fred Davis, “ The chief difficulty of understanding fashion in its apparent vagaries is the lack of exact knowledge of the unconscious symbolisms attaching to forms, colors, textures, postures, and other expressive elements of a given cultures. The difficulty is increased by the fact that some of the expressive elements tend to have quite different symbolic references in different areas. "  The meanings that are constructed through fashion largely depend on culturally accepted codes.  This can be demonstrated in the choice of color for wedding ceremonies across different cultures.  For example, a white dress is the traditional attire for a wedding ceremony in the western culture; however in the Asian culture the color white is associated with death and would be more appropriately worn at a funeral.

Specific dress codes are identified by individuals within a culture and convey a message to help categorize and create meaning. A uniform is a specific type of clothing that is worn to associate that person with an organization, trade or rank. Uniforms are symbolic and their meanings are arbitrary, in that they stand for their referent based upon agreement or habit of individuals within that culture. In western society a policeman will typically wear variations of a blue suit and this generally symbolizes law, security, and authority. Doctors wear white lab coats to represent their profession in health and also to suggest sanitation. Nuns wear black and white dresses that associate them with their involvement in religion.

Fashion can go beyond symbolizing a profession, it can also communicate ideas about an individuals personality, social status, or religious belonging. The Burka is a head covering worn by Islamic women and signifies their belonging to an Islamic society. Brand name jeans and designer label garments are worn by individuals to represent value or status in a society. Desmond Morris states, "It is impossible to wear clothes without transmitting social signals."
Roland Barthes was a semiotician, who studied the fashion system and how ideologies are transmitted through dress. The semiotic system is formed by social interests and ideologies, and the fashion system is no different. In our society the ideologies in fashion are often implemented by celebrities or the dominant class. Jackie Kennedy was an important style icon for American women during the 1960s, where her style became a symbol of wealth, power and prestige .

The fashion system is not static, and as society and social interests change, so do trends and styles in dress. Pants were originally a garment worn by men and signified masculinity, but society evolved and pants became an acceptable garment for both men and women. Pants are no longer confined to signifying masculinity. Society changes and as individuals in that society adapt so do their dress codes and fashion choices. Fashion is a system of signs, whose meanings and significations are constantly shifting and changing depending on the time, place, and culture.

References 

Fashion
Semiotics